This is a list of public art in University of Copenhagen Botanical Garden in Copenhagen, Denmark.

See also
 List of public art in Rosenborg Castle Gardens

Botanical Garden
Copenhagen-related lists
Copenhagen Botanical Garden